"Moves" is a hip hop song recorded by American rapper Big Sean. It was originally released on December 22, 2016, as a promotional single then later sent to rhythmic radio as the second official single from his fourth studio album, I Decided (2017). The song was produced by Fuse and Tre Pounds, with additional production by Amaire Johnson. It features additional songwriting by Serge Durand.

Release
Sean previewed "Moves" on December 16, 2016, and premiered the full version of the song on December 22, 2016.

Music video
The music video for the song, directed by Mike Carson, premiered on January 4, 2017 via Sean's Vevo channel.

Chart performance
Moves peaked at number 38 on the US Billboard Hot 100 and spent a total of 18 weeks on the chart. It also peaked at number 15 on the Hot R&B/Hip-Hop Songs chart. On August 19, 2020, the single was certified double platinum by the Recording Industry Association of America (RIAA) for combined sales and streaming data of over two million units in the United States.

Charts

Weekly charts

Year-end charts

Certifications

References

2017 singles
Big Sean songs
Def Jam Recordings singles
GOOD Music singles
Songs written by Big Sean
2017 songs